The 1974 US Open was a tennis tournament that took place on the outdoor grass courts at the West Side Tennis Club in Forest Hills, Queens, in New York City, USA. The tournament ran from 26 August until 8 September. It was the 94th staging of the US Open, and the fourth Grand Slam tennis event of 1974. The girls’ championship was introduced in 1974, and it was the last year the tournament was played on grass courts.

Seniors

Men's singles

 Jimmy Connors defeated  Ken Rosewall, 6–1, 6–0, 6–1
It was Connors 3rd career Grand Slam title, and his 1st US Open title. Connors' victory took just over an hour.

Women's singles

 Billie Jean King defeated  Evonne Goolagong, 3–6, 6–3, 7–5 
It was King's 11th career Grand Slam title, her 7th during the Open Era, and her 4th (and last) US Open title.

Men's doubles

 Bob Lutz /  Stan Smith defeated  Patricio Cornejo /  Jaime Fillol, 6–3, 6–3

Women's doubles

 Rosemary Casals /  Billie Jean King defeated  Françoise Dürr /  Betty Stöve, 7–6, 6–7, 6–4

Mixed doubles

 Pam Teeguarden /  Geoff Masters defeated  Chris Evert /  Jimmy Connors, 6–1, 7–6

Juniors

Boys' singles
 Billy Martin defeated  Ferdi Taygan, 6–4, 6–2

Girls' singles
 Ilana Kloss defeated  Mima Jaušovec, 6–4, 6–3

References

External links
Official US Open website

 
 

 
US Open
US Open (tennis) by year
1974 in sports in New York City
1974 in American tennis
US Open
US Open